Intrafusal muscle fibers are skeletal muscle fibers that serve as specialized sensory organs (proprioceptors). They detect the amount and rate of change in length of a muscle. They constitute the muscle spindle, and are innervated by both sensory (afferent) and motor (efferent) fibers.

Intrafusal muscle fibers are not to be confused with extrafusal muscle fibers, which contract, generating skeletal movement and are innervated by alpha motor neurons.

Structure

Types 
There are two types of intrafusal muscle fibers: nuclear bag fibers and nuclear chain fibers. They bear two types of sensory ending, known as annulospiral and flower-spray endings. Both ends of these fibers contract, but the central region only stretches and does not contract.

Intrafusal muscle fibers are walled off from the rest of the muscle by an outer connective tissue sheath consisting of flattened fibroblasts and collagen. This sheath has a spindle or "fusiform" shape, hence the name "intrafusal".

Innervation 
They are innervated by gamma motor neurons and beta motor neurons. Gamma efferents from small multipolar neurons from anterior gray column innervate it. These form a part of neuromuscular spindles.

Function 
Intrafusal muscle fibers detect the amount and rate of change in muscle length. It is by the sensory information from gamma motor neurons and beta motor neurons that an individual is able to judge the position of their muscles.

See also
 Alpha motor neuron 
 Beta motor neuron
 Extrafusal muscle fiber
 Gamma motor neuron
 Type Ia sensory fiber
 Type II sensory fiber

References

External links
 Histology at ucsd.edu
 Histology at umdnj.edu
 

Muscular system